The Coinage of Aegina began in the 6th century BC. The front has a sea turtle design, while the back has a punch mark, found on most coins at that time. The earliest coins were made of electrum, a mix of gold and silver. The coins were first made in the island of Aegina, off the southeast side of Greece. Some historical sources say the first coins were made by the king of Argos, Pheidon. The coins with 'turtle' design are considered "an important early trading currency".

See also
 Stater

References

Coins of ancient Greece
Turtles in art